Eda Rae (Sinhala, That Night) is a 1953 Sri Lankan film directed by Shanthi Kumar Seneviratne and Produced by Sisil Disanayaka. The film stars  Sita Jayawardena and Herbie Seneviratne in lead roles whereas Shanthi Kumar, Premnath Moraes and Wanshawathi Daulagala made supporting roles. The music was directed by Mohammed Gauss.

The film achieved some popularity in the country. The musician Latha Walpola debuted as a playback singer in this film.

Cast
 Sita Jayawardena as Chandra
 Herbie Seneviratne as Banda
 Shanthi Kumar as Ranjith
 Premnath Moraes as Lakdasa
 Wanshawathi Daulagala as Maggie
 Dudley Wanaguru as Maggie's brother
 Thilakasiri Fernando
 Latha Walpola
 Austin Abeysekara as Mudali
 Louie Rodrigo as Bonso
 J. H. Jayawardena as Billiards player
 Michel Sannas Liyanage as Victor

Songs
"Hari Hari Ha Ha" – Herbert Seneviratne and Latha Walpola
"Anandey" – Rudrani
"Mage Pana" Louie Rodrigo and group
"Saa Maa Daa Saa" – Rudrani and Mohideen Baig
"Nayana Rasi Wey" – Rudrani and Mohideen Baig
"Davi Gini Jalayen" – Rudrani
"Habata Mage" – Herbert Seneviratne and Latha Walpola
"Sidara Aley" – Mohideen Baig
"Haridey Pem Githa Rase" – Mohideen Baig and Rudrani
"Ho - Dulevi Prema Dhara" – Mohideen Baig and Rudrani
"May Prithi Prithi Darling" – Herbert Seneviratne and Latha Walpola
"Gee Nade Shantha" – Mohideen Baig

References
 

1953 films
Sinhala-language films